This is a list of hospitals for each country in Europe.

Sovereign states

States with limited recognition
Abkhazia, List of hospitals in Abkhazia, :Category:Hospitals in Abkhazia, 
Artsak, List of hospitals in the Republic of Artsakh, :Category:Hospitals in the Republic of Artsakh
Kosovo, List of hospitals in Kosovo, :Category:Hospitals in Kosovo, 
Northern Cyprus, List of hospitals in Northern Cyprus, 
South Ossetia, List of hospitals in South Ossetia, :Category:Hospitals in South Ossetia, 
Transnistria, List of hospitals in Transnistria, :Category:Hospitals in Transnistria,

Dependencies and other entities
Åland:  Ålands Hälso och sjukvård (ÅHS) is in charge of public health care in Åland. It offers medical care to both the local population and visitors. This includes everything from preventive care to specialized hospital care.
Faroe Islands: There are three hospitals in the Faroe Islands-The National Hospital of the Faroe Islands in Tórshavn, The hospital in Klaksvík, and The hospital in Suðuroy.
Gibraltar: Gibraltar has the St Bernard's Hospital, a 210-bed facility that opened in 2005. Psychiatric care is provided by King George V Hospital.
Guernsey: Princess Elizabeth Hospital is the only acute care facility in Guernsey.
Isle of Man: There are two hospitals on the island, the main one being Noble's Hospital, with 314 beds, giving about four beds per 1,000 residents, around the European average, but considerably higher than in the UK.  Tertiary services are provided by the English NHS. The much smaller Ramsey Cottage Hospital has 31 beds and is situated in the town of Ramsey, on the north of the island. 
Jersey: See List of hospitals in Jersey, :Category:Hospitals in Jersey; There are two hospitals in Jersey:  Jersey General Hospital, St Helier and the St Saviour's Hospital, St Saviour
Svalbard:  There is a hospital in Longyearbyen, the largest settlement on the archipelago.

See also
Lists of hospitals in Asia
Lists of hospitals in Africa
Lists of hospitals in North America
Lists of hospitals in Oceania
Lists of hospitals in South America

References

 
Europe-related lists
Lists of buildings and structures in Europe